Sankarankovil is a city in the Tenkasi district in the Indian state of Tamil Nadu. It was formerly known as Sankaranayinarkoil. Sankarankovil is the home to the Sankara Narayanar Temple .

History 

Sankarankovil is home to the Sankara Narayanar Temple, which was built by Ugra Pandiyan in 900 BC. Houses the deity by the name Sankara Narayanan, which is half Shiva and the other half Vishnu. According to folklore, the devotees of Hari (Vishnu) and Shiva once quarreled with each other to determine which god was more powerful, until Shiva appeared as Sankaranarayanar to show his devotees that Hari and Shiva were one and the same. Thus, it is held sacred by Saivites and those Hindus who believe that Shiva and Vishnu are a single deity. Srivaishnavites of Tamil Nadu who worship Vishnu only do not accept this and hence reject the temple. The deities of the temple are Sankareswarar, Gomathi Amman and Sankaranarayanar. Sankarankovil is also said to be home to the deity named Avudai Ambal.

In older times, the city was called as Sankaranayinarkoil. It is also noted for the "Adi Thabasu" festival.

There is a belief that the sand from the temple, known as puttrumann (puttru meaning ant hill, mann meaning sand) is capable of curing all diseases. Devotees believe that Sankarankovil's Nagachunai (sacred tank) was dug by serpent kings named Paduman and Sangam, and has a miraculous power to heal those who bath there. Once, a deva called Manikkeerivan was cursed by the goddess Parvathi and, as a result, had to come to earth and work as a gardener in a beautiful garden. One day while he was clearing a snake pit, the snake's tail was also cut. He found a lingam next to the snake. He went and informed his king, Ugra Pandiyan. The king considered it to be the god's wish to stay there and constructed the temple and a city around it.

Demographics 

According to 2011 census, Sankarankoil had a population of 70, 574 with a sex-ratio of 1,012 females for every 1,000 males, much above the national average of 929. A total of 5,660 were under the age of six, constituting 2,867 males and 2,793 females. Scheduled Castes and Scheduled Tribes accounted for 22.47% and .3% of the population respectively. The average literacy of the town was 74.9%, compared to the national average of 72.99%. The town had a total of 14536 households. There were a total of 24,064 workers, comprising 493 cultivators, 2,003 main agricultural labourers, 2,245 in house hold industries, 17,190 other workers, 2,133 marginal workers, 34 marginal cultivators, 247 marginal agricultural labourers, 413 marginal workers in household industries and 1,439 other marginal workers. Hindus are the majority in the town with 90% of the population, followed by Islam (5%), and Christianity (5%).

Politics 

Sankarankovil Assembly constituency is part of Tenkasi Lok Sabha constituency. E. Raja from DMK is the MLA.

Economy 
Apart from agribusiness, the town is known for its textiles. Nearly 4000 powerlooms are directly involved in producing various kinds of textile products such as terry towels, cotton saris, lungis, handkerchiefs, etc. The produced products are marketed all over India directly.

Transport

Air
It is linked with Chennai, Sri Lanka, Singapore and other major cities of India. The other nearest international airport is located in Trivandrum.

Road
Sankarankovil has two bus stands. The main bus stand is near the Sankarankovil Municipality office, and is also called the Anna Bus Stand. The new bus stand is nearby to the Sankarankovil Taluk office, and is also called the Thanthai Periyar New Bus Stand.

Sankarankovil is situated at the intersection of State Highways 41 and 76. Also it is situated near National Highways 07 and 208.

The main bus routes are to cities / towns like Tirunelveli,Virudhunagar, Madurai, Tuticorin, Nagercoil, Tenkasi, Rajapalayam, Srivilliputhur, Sivakasi, Surandai, Kalugumalai, Thiruvenkatam, Valliyur, Courtallam, Shencottah, Aryankavu, Ambasamudram, Kanyakumari, Tiruchendur, Rameshwaram, Tirumangalam, Aruppukottai, Kovilpatti, Sivagiri, Kayathar, Sattur, Nanguneri, Ettaiyapuram, Karivalamvandha Nallur and so on. Sankarankovil has state transport (SETC) bus routes to Kodaikanal, Munnar, Madurai, Chennai, Coimbatore, Trichy, Palakkad, Calicut, Dindigul, Hosur and so on.

Railway

There are three daily passenger trains Madurai to Shencottah through Sankarankovil. Also there are three daily passenger trains Shencottah to Madurai through Sankarankovil. Also there is daily two express trains. One is Chennai to Shencottah through Sankarankovil . Also there is Shencottah to Chennai through Sankarankovil.

Municipality 

Sankarankovil includes many localities, including Karivalamvandha Nallur, Gomathi Nagar, Gomathiyapuram Nagar, Ramasamiapuram, Sangupuram Nagar, Lakshmiyapuram Nagar, Vadukkupudhur, Therkku Sankarankovil, NGO Colony, Ezhil Nagar, and Mullai Nagar.

Sankarankovil RTO 
Sankarankovil RTO was opened by chief minister Ms. J. Jayalalitha Jayaram via video conference.

Notable people from Sankarankovil
 Mozhi Gnayiru(The sun of Language). Devaneya Pavanar (Tamil Writer)
 V.Gopalasamy (Vaiko) (Founder of MDMK)
 Karuppasamy (minister in ADMK government, up to 22 October 2011)
 S. Thangavelu (ex state minister, member of parliament (R.S.) [D.M.K]
 Vivek (Actor)
 S. J. Surya (Actor)
 Ramasamy Rajesh Kumar Nuclear Agriculture Scientist and Social Worker

References

Cities and towns in Tenkasi district